The Hualian River, also spelled Hualien River, is a river in Taiwan. The Hai'an Range starts at the mouth of the river.

Tributaries
There are five major tributaries, listed here from mouth to source:
Mugua River — Hualien County — 42 km
Shoufeng River — Hualien County — 37 km
Wanli River — Hualien County — 53 km
Ma'an River — Hualien County — 39 km
Guangfu River — Hualien County — 15 km

See also
List of rivers in Taiwan

References

Landforms of Hualien County
Rivers of Taiwan